Cristina Dorador Ortiz (born February 28, 1980) is a Chilean scientist, doctor, and politician who conducts research in microbiology, microbial ecology, limnology and geomicrobiology. She is also an Associate Professor in the department of biotechnology of the Faculty of Marine Sciences and Natural Resources at the University of Antofagasta.

She coordinates in Chile of the Extreme Environment Network for the study of ecosystems in the geographical extremes of Chile and has developed biotechnological tools to value the unique properties of some highland microbial communities such as resistance to ultraviolet radiation for elaborate cosmetic creams, joining the field of cosmetic biotechnology. She has also led the development of textile material using the photoprotective properties of highland bacteria.

She was a member of the transition council of the National Commission for Scientific and Technological Research in 2019 that gave rise to the National Agency for Research and Development of Chile, and has been recognized nationally and internationally as one of the most relevant researchers in Chile.

Since July 2021, she has served as a conventional constituent for District 3, which represents the Antofagasta Region.

Biography
Cristina Dorador was born in Antofagasta in 1980, where she spent her childhood and completed her primary and secondary studies. She later obtained her degree in Biology from the Faculty of Sciences at the University of Chile in Santiago. She then did a Ph.D. at the University of Kiel in Germany and the Max Planck Institute for Limnology in Plön and obtained a job at the University of Antofagasta.

She is the daughter of teacher and poet Wilfredo Dorador and Milena Ortiz, also a teacher. She formed her family with the English researcher Chris Harrod with whom she has two children.

Education and scientific activities
Dorador is a biologist from the University of Chile. She subsequently obtained her Ph.D. in Natural Sciences with a minor in microbiology at the Christian-Albrechts Universität zu Kiel in Kiel, Germany in 2007.

She has studied ecosystems of the highland salt flats system, investigating the importance of microbes for the extreme systems of the Atacama Desert.

Dorador has described the ability of bacteria to degrade synthetic compounds such as polyesters and plastics. She has also highlighted the microbial diversity at high altitudes and the properties that make them resistant to extreme conditions. The microbial activity of salt flats in northern Chile is today a relevant issue for the biological heritage of Chile thanks to the field studies carried out by Dorador and her team in the last 10 years.

Scientific dissemination
She has been a scientific advisor to the PAR Explora Antofagasta program of the National Commission for Scientific and Technological Research and participated in other dissemination bodies such as Puerto de Ideas, Congreso Futuro and TEDx. In parallel, she is a columnist in the Chilean scientific dissemination blog Ethylmercury. She is a member of the Asociación Red de Investigadoras.

Politics
She was registered as an independent candidate in the 2021 conventional constituent elections for district 3 (Calama, María Elena, Ollagüe, San Pedro de Atacama, Tocopilla, Antofagasta, Mejillones, Sierra Gorda and Taltal), forming part of the independent movement of the north. She was elected with 12.68% of the votes, reaching the first majority of the district.

Awards and distinctions
Dorador is a member of the international panel of the international society for microbial ecology. and she was a member of the transition council of the National Commission for Scientific and Technological Research in 2019 that gave rise to the National Research and Development Agency of Chile.

According to the report "Ciencias Imagen Chile" developed by Marca Chile in 2018, Dorador is among the most prominent Chilean researchers in international media. She was also chosen in 2017 as one of the 100 leading women in the country by El Mercurio.

Her commitment to the communities of northern Chile was reflected in the laboratory that bears her name at the Liceo Radomiro Tomic in Calama. Cristina was the representative of Chile as a young scientist in the book “Young Scientists. A bright future for the Americas," published by the InterAmerican Network of Academies of Sciences.

Selected publications

References

External links
 
 
 
 

20th-century women
21st-century women
1980 births
Chilean women scientists
University of Chile alumni
University of Kiel alumni
Members of the Chilean Constitutional Convention
People from Antofagasta
Living people
21st-century Chilean politicians
21st-century Chilean women politicians